QIT Madagascar Minerals (QMM) is a mining company located in the Fort-Dauphin region of southeastern Madagascar. After roughly 20 years of exploration, negotiations, and preliminary work, the company began production of the titanium dioxide ore, ilmenite. Initial capacity is projected at 750,000 tonnes per year, with future phases of development potentially expanding capacity to 2,000,000 tonnes per year. The mine is 80% owned by QIT-Fer et Titane, a wholly owned subsidiary of the mining giant Rio Tinto Group; the remaining 20% is owned by the government of Madagascar.

Hybrid energy
In 2021 Rio Tinto signed a power purchase agreement with independent power producer. The facility will combine 8MW of solar, 12MW of onshore wind and a battery energy storage system to provide renewable power to Rio Tinto’s QMM ilmenite mine in Fort Dauphin.

References

External links
Official website

Rio Tinto (corporation) subsidiaries
Titanium mining
Mining companies of Madagascar